Ponticoccus is a bacterial genus from the family of Propionibacteriaceae.

References

Further reading 
 
 
 

Rhodobacteraceae
Bacteria genera